Uhm Jung-hwa (born August 17, 1969) is a South Korean singer, actress and dancer. Uhm is considered to be one of the most influential women in the Korean entertainment industry, finding rare success in both music and film. Her legacy and career reinventions have given her the nickname of  "Korean Madonna".

Uhm began her career in 1989 as a chorus member for the broadcasting company MBC. She starred in the 1993 romance drama film, On a Windy Day, We Must Go to Apgujeong, and released her debut studio album, Sorrowful Secret, that same year. Though both releases found limited audiences, the album's lead single, "Pupil", helped to establish a uniquely sensual image for Uhm.

She pivoted to dance music with 1996's "Sad Expectation", and found breakthrough success with "Rose of Betrayal" (배반의 장미) from her third studio album, After Love (1997). Subsequent releases Invitation (1998) and 005.1999.06 (1999) were bolstered by a string of hit singles: "Poison", "Invitation", "I Don't Know" (몰라), and "Festival", which gained status as her signature songs and cemented her position as one of the preeminent pop icons of the late-1990s.

Starting in 2001, Uhm began to concentrate efforts on her acting career. Her performance in the 2002 erotic comedy Marriage Is a Crazy Thing won Best Actress at the 39th Baeksang Arts Awards, a category she received another nomination for in 2006 with Princess Aurora and won again in 2012 with Dancing Queen.

Her 2000s musical output saw declining commercial reception but greater appeal with critics. Uhm began experimenting with electronica on Self Control (2004), and funk on Prestige (2006), the latter of which won Best Dance and Electronic Album at the 4th Korean Music Awards. In 2008, she experienced a commercial resurgence with the single "D.I.S.C.O". Following a nearly decade-long hiatus from music, she released her tenth studio album The Cloud Dream of the Nine in 2017.

Biography

Early life
Uhm was born in Jecheon, North Chungcheong, South Korea. She is the second child of Yoo Gyeong-sook and Uhm Jin-ok, a music teacher who died in a motorcycle accident when she was six. Her younger and only brother Uhm Tae-woong is an actor. Following her father's death, her family struggled financially.

Music career

1990s
Uhm Jung-hwa officially debuted as a singer in 1993 with her first studio album Sorrowful Secret. By the mid-90s she established herself as one of the top Korean female singers and entertainers, with a series of hit singles: "Sad Expectation", "A Love Only Heaven Permits", "Rose of Betrayal", and "Tell Me".

Uhm's fourth studio album, Invitation, introduced a new mature side of the singer. The music video for its title track caused a lot of controversy due to its suggestive nature. Invitation quickly became one of the highest selling albums of the year and received positive reviews from critics and fans.

She released two of her most recognizable singles of her career, "Poison" and "Invitation". She remained successful the following year, in 1999, with her fifth studio album 005.1999.06

As of 2020 she currently released ten studio albums, two compilation albums and one extended play.

2000s–present
During the 2000s, Uhm began to focus more on her acting career and committed herself to taking a variety of acting roles. She also began to pursue and experiment with different musical genres, in particular electronica. In 2004, she released her double album Self Control, which featured songs composed by Jung Jae-hyung, Fractal and Roller Coaster. Music critics praised Uhm for her ability to reinvent her image and sound.

After a two-year break from the music scene, she released her ninth studio album Prestige. Throughout the year she released two singles, "Come 2 Me" and "Song of the Wind", each enjoyed positive critical reception. In early 2007, she won a Korean Music Award for Best Electronic Dance Record.

In the summer of 2008, she released her first EP titled D.I.S.C.O with help from her longtime friend Yang Hyun-suk of YG Entertainment. The lead single "D.I.S.C.O" featured T.O.P, a member from the popular boy band Big Bang. The EP was one of the best-selling albums by a female artist in 2008, and was further promoted by the digital single "D.I.S.C.O Part 2" which was a remix version of "D.I.S.C.O" and featured G-Dragon, the leader of BigBang.

After an eight-year-long hiatus Uhm announced that she would be releasing her first new album since D.I.S.C.O in 2008, the album title would be The Cloud Dream of the Nine. She revealed that she would be releasing the album in two parts, the first part would be released on December 27, 2017, and the second part at a later date. Uhm performed the title tracks "Watch Me Move" and "Dreamer" on Gayo Daejeon along with "D.I.S.C.O", she would also perform the two tracks on MCountdown on the January 5. One year after the release of Part 1, Uhm revealed through her Instagram account that she was in the preparation stage of her comeback with part 2 of The Cloud Dream of the Nine.

In the summer of 2020, Uhm joined with singers Lee Hyori, Jessi, and Hwasa to form the "supergroup" Refund Sisters. Their first single, "Don't Touch Me" debuted in October 2020, and reached #1 on the Gaon chart.

Acting career

Uhm has established herself as one of South Korea's top actresses. She is known for her roles in the films Marriage Is a Crazy Thing, Singles, Princess Aurora, Dancing Queen, Seducing Mr. Perfect and Haeundae, which became one of the highest-grossing movies in Korea. She has won two Baeksang Arts Awards for Best Actress, in 2002 for Marriage is a Crazy Thing and again in 2012 for Dancing Queen.

In 2022, Uhm is back on the small screen with the tvN drama Our Blues, which is their comeback on the small screen in 5 years since 2017.

Fashion line
Uhm launched her new clothing and lingerie line, "Corner Suite" and "ZHUM in New York", which made $10M USD within three months of its release. "Corner Suite" became an instant hit when the line debuted on online markets. The line immediately sold out. Future plans include putting her line of clothes on more home shopping channels, as the demand for it is great.

Personal life
Uhm was diagnosed with thyroid cancer but fully recovered after surgery in May 2010. Uhm said she felt a little afraid leading up to the surgery, but rather than being discouraged by the pain she was experiencing, she made up her mind to dedicate herself to helping others by inspiring them. "I want to use my talent and influence in a meaningful way," she said.

Impact
Artists who have cited Uhm as an influence or role model include BoA, Lee Hyori, Baek Ji-young, Sandara Park, Tiffany Young, Jung Eun-chae, Son Dam-bi, Kim Yoon-ji, Dal Shabet's Ah Young, Laboum's Solbin, and Apink's Park Cho-rong.

Discography

Studio albums

Compilation albums

Extended plays

Singles

OSTs

Other appearances

Filmography

Film

Television series

Reality show

Theater

Awards and nominations

Acting Awards

Music awards

Accolades

In 2021 she was selected as Jury member for Actor and Actress of the Year Award in 26th Busan International Film Festival to be held in October.

Notes

References

External links

 Official website
 
 
 

1969 births
K-pop singers
Living people
Korean Mandopop singers
People from Jecheon
People from North Chungcheong Province
Mystic Entertainment artists
South Korean female models
South Korean women pop singers
South Korean film actresses
South Korean television actresses
South Korean female idols
MAMA Award winners
Korean Music Award winners
Yeongwol Eom clan
20th-century South Korean women singers
21st-century South Korean women singers
Best Actress Paeksang Arts Award (film) winners